A fruit butter is a sweet spread made of fruit cooked to a paste, then lightly sweetened. It falls into the same category as jelly and jam. Apple butter and plum butter are common examples, but fruit butters can be made from any firm fruit. Fruit pastes, such as quince cheese are popular in Latin American countries, are similar but more highly sweetened and jelled.  They are sold in shallow tins or as wrapped bricks, while fruit butters usually come in wide-mouthed jars.

In order to make fruit butter, the fruit is cooked on a low temperature until much of its water has evaporated, and is then blended. 
Sweeteners such as honey or sugar are often added, as are spices.

Varieties
 Apple butter
 Guava paste (Cajeta de guayaba, mariola or bocadillo)
 Banana paste (mariola)
 Mango butter or paste (Cajeta de mango)
 Pear butter
 Plum butter (Powidl)
 Pumpkin butter
 Fig butter or paste
 sirop de Liège

References

Spreads (food)
Fruit dishes
Jams and jellies

de:Mus